The LFG Roland D.II was a German single-seat fighter of World War I. The type was manufactured by Luftfahrzeug Gesellschaft, and also by Pfalz Flugzeugwerke under license.

Design and development
The D.II used a plywood monocoque fuselage. Two layers of plywood strips were spirally wrapped in opposing directions over a mold to form one half of a fuselage shell. The fuselage halves were then glued together, covered with a layer of fabric, and doped. This design, which was known as the Wickelrumpf, allowed the creation of a smooth, strong and light structure. The upper wing was attached to the fuselage by means of a large central pylon, greatly impairing the pilot's forward vision. Armament consisted of twin "Spandau" LMG 08/15 machine guns buried in the fuselage decking.

The D.II was initially powered by a 160 hp Mercedes D.III engine, giving a top speed of 105 mph at sea level. Later aircraft, designated D.IIa, were powered by a 180 hp Argus As.III. The As.III offered poor performance above 3,000 m and the D.IIa was mostly relegated to operations on the Eastern Front.

Nicknamed Haifisch (shark) for its sleek appearance, the D.II and D.IIa proved generally unpopular in service due to poor fields of view and heavy controls. It was quite fast and strong, but had mediocre manoeuvrability and handling. However, it is also reported that the aircraft had particularly sensitive controls, particularly in the yawing plane. The type is known to have been used by Jasta 25 at their Canatlarzi base in Macedonia in 1917.

Variants

 D.II: Single-seat fighter-scout biplane, powered by a 160 hp (119 kW) Mercedes D.III piston engine.
 D.IIa: Single-seat fighter-scout biplane, powered by a 180 hp (134 kW) Argus As.III piston engine.
 C.V: One-off two seat derivative with a 160 hp (119 kW) Mercedes D.III engine.
 Pfalz D.II/D.IIa: aircraft licence-built by Pfalz Flugzeugwerke, from February 1917 renamed Roland D.II/D.IIa (Pfal). There were built 100 D.II (s/n 2830-2929/16) and 100 D.IIa (s/n 300-399/17).

Operators

Bulgarian Air Force

Luftstreitkräfte
Jasta 25
Jasta 27
Jasta 32
Kaiserliche Marine

Specifications (D.II)

See also

References

Notes

Bibliography

 Angelucci, Enzo (editor). World Encyclopedia of Military Aircraft. London: Jane's, 1981. .
 Cowin, H. W. German and Austrian Aviation of World War I. Oxford: Osprey Publishing, 2000. .
 Donald, David (editor). The Encyclopedia of World Aircraft. London: Blitz, 1997. .
 Gray, Peter and Thetford, Owen. German Aircraft of the First World War. London: Putnam, 1962.
 Green, William and Swanborough, Gordon. The Complete Book of Fighters. London: Salamander Books, 1994. .

1910s German fighter aircraft
Military aircraft of World War I
D.II
Aircraft first flown in 1916